Alan Michael Yang (born August 22, 1983) is an American screenwriter, producer, director and actor. He was a writer and producer for the NBC sitcom Parks and Recreation, for which he received his first Emmy nomination. With Aziz Ansari, Yang co-created the Netflix series Master of None, which premiered in 2015 to critical acclaim. The series was awarded a Peabody Award, and at the 68th Emmy Awards in 2016, Yang and Ansari won for  Outstanding Writing for a Comedy Series for Master of None and became the first writers of Asian descent to win in the category, which was also nominated in the  Outstanding Comedy Series category. Yang also was the screenwriter of the 2014 comedy Date and Switch. In 2018, Yang co-created the Amazon Video series Forever.

Early life
Yang was born and raised in Riverside, California. His parents were originally from Taiwan. His father is a retired OB-GYN from Huwei and his mother is a high school math teacher. Yang attended high school at Riverside Poly High School in Riverside, California. He studied biology at Harvard University, graduating at age 20. While at Harvard, Yang wrote for the college's humor magazine, the Harvard Lampoon, where he first began doing comedy. Yang said in an interview that he chose to study Biology when his parents told him math and science were a "safe zone" for people of color. While at Harvard, Yang began following the Boston Red Sox in college and developed an interest in baseball. This led to writing for "Fire Joe Morgan", a sports journalism blog, under the pseudonym "Junior." He wrote the blog alongside Michael Schur, who was a producer and writer for The Office at the time. The two would later work together on Parks and Recreation and The Good Place.

Career

Writing
After graduating from Harvard, Yang tried to break into a career in comedy writing—with law school as a fall back. Yang was named "10 Screenwriters to Watch" by Variety magazine in 2009. He wrote for Last Call with Carson Daly and contributed to South Park before he landed a job in 2008 as a staff writer for the then-upcoming NBC comedy Parks and Recreation. He was hired six months before the job began, so he wrote two screenplays, White Dad and Gay Dude. White Dad was sold to Sony in 2008 and Gay Dude was on the Hollywood blacklist before being sold to Lionsgate Films in 2011 and was released in 2014 as Date and Switch. Yang wrote the Funny or Die short, Parks and Recreation is the Wu Tang of Comedy (2010) directed by Dean Holland and Michael Schur, starring Aziz Ansari, Rashida Jones, Amy Poehler,  as well as RZA and Questlove.

In 2012, Yang started writing a sitcom about a father-son relationship; when Parks and Rec producer Greg Daniels suggested he make the characters Asian, Yang declined as he assumed it would not be successful. On Parks and Recreation, however, he became friends with actor/comedian Aziz Ansari, and the two later co-created Master of None, which debuted November 6, 2015 on Netflix. The series was well received—especially for its diverse cast and subject matter—and earned four Emmy nominations, and Yang and Ansari shared the Emmy for Outstanding Writing for a Comedy Series for their Master of None episode, "Parents." Yang said in an interview that Brian's character in the episode, played by Kelvin Yu, was largely based on himself and his family. "It's based on my dad, Aziz's dad, and our families in general. A lot of that stuff was written as conversations that Aziz and I would have." Yang and Ansari were also awarded a Peabody Award in May 2016.

According to Yang, while topics on the show include racial diversity and racism, the main goal is to be authentic to their life experiences. "We try to do a blend in our show of what we talk about in our real lives", he told Variety in June 2016. "There's an episode or two about being Indian or Asian on TV, about dealing with your parents who are immigrants — but we fall in love, we have work trouble, we have all these other stories that make the characters more well rounded." The second season was released in 2017.

In 2016, Yang began writing for The Good Place, and was credited for the second episode. He also directed an episode in the show's second season.

In 2018, he reunited with Matt Hubbard, who worked on Parks and Recreation with Yang, to create Amazon's Forever, a comedy-drama series starring Fred Armisen and Maya Rudolph. Yang is also currently working on producing Little America, a show he describes as "like Black Mirror, but instead of being super-dark sci-fi stories, it is immigrant stories."

Directing and producing
For Parks and Recreation, he has directed two episodes: "New Beginnings" (2014) (Season 6, Episode 11) and "Swing Vote" (2013) (Season 5, Episode 21). In addition to being a writer on the show and writing 16 episodes, Yang served as a story editor for 24 episodes and an executive story editor for 6 episodes. He also occasionally appears as a member of Andy's band, Mouse Rat. Yang also directed the Jay-Z music video "Moonlight", revised by Zong Yu. The music video was supposed to be a depiction of the American show Friends with an all African-American cast.

He also served as an executive producer for Master of None, as a co-executive producer, supervising producer, producer and co-producer on Parks and Recreation, an executive producer on Date and Switch (2014), a consulting producer on South Park (the episode "Miss Teacher Bangs A Boy" (2006)), a producer on the Funny or Die short Parks and Recreation is the Wu Tang of Comedy (2010), and as an associate producer on Last Call with Carson Daly. He served as a consultant for the 2007 MTV Movie Awards.

Yang produced the Amazon series Forever, which is a drama/comedy show about a married couple and their adventures in Riverside, California, Yang's hometown.

Acting
Yang has appeared as "Chang" (or "Bass Player" or "Alan") on 14 episodes of Parks and Recreation. He also appears in the short film Food Club (2014), directed by Eric Wareheim, and on Kroll Show as a contestant on the episode "Sponsored by Stamps" (2014). He also is a performer on the song "5,000 Candles In The Wind" on two episodes of Parks and Recreation ("Moving Up: Part 2" and "Lil' Sebastian").

Other work
He is friends with chef David Chang and was featured in the Netflix non-fiction original series Ugly Delicious episode "Fried Rice" where he discussed Chinese cuisine. Yang has also done standup comedy in a small local stand-up comedy club.

Personal life 
Yang is engaged to actress Christine Ko.

Filmography

Film

Television

Awards

References

External links

 

Living people
1983 births
American writers of Taiwanese descent
American male screenwriters
The Harvard Lampoon alumni
Harvard College alumni
Writers from Riverside, California
Primetime Emmy Award winners
Peabody Award winners
Screenwriters from California
American comedians of Asian descent